Savinder Singh (born 2 June 1938) is a Malaysian field hockey player. He competed in the men's tournament at the 1968 Summer Olympics.

References

External links

1938 births
Living people
Malaysian people of Punjabi descent
Malaysian sportspeople of Indian descent
Malaysian male field hockey players
Olympic field hockey players of Malaysia
Field hockey players at the 1968 Summer Olympics
Place of birth missing (living people)
Asian Games medalists in field hockey
Asian Games bronze medalists for Malaysia
Medalists at the 1974 Asian Games
Medalists at the 1978 Asian Games
Field hockey players at the 1974 Asian Games
Field hockey players at the 1978 Asian Games